Bucculatrix flexuosa is a moth in the family Bucculatricidae. The species was described in 1897 by Thomas de Grey, 6th Baron Walsingham. It is found in the West Indies.

The larvae feed on Acacia nilotica.

References

Natural History Museum Lepidoptera generic names catalog

Bucculatricidae
Moths described in 1897
Taxa named by Thomas de Grey, 6th Baron Walsingham